Upsilon Andromedae (υ Andromedae, abbreviated Upsilon And, υ And) is a binary star located 44 light-years from Earth in the constellation of Andromeda. The system consists of an F-type main-sequence star (designated υ Andromedae A, officially named Titawin in the Amazigh language ) and a smaller red dwarf.

, four extrasolar planets (designated Upsilon Andromedae b, c, d and e; the first three named Saffar, Samh and Majriti, respectively) are believed to orbit υ Andromedae A. All four are likely to be jovian planets that are comparable in size to Jupiter. This was both the first multiple-planet system to be discovered around a main-sequence star, and the first multiple-planet system known in a multiple-star system.

Nomenclature 
υ Andromedae (Latinised to Upsilon Andromedae) is the system's Bayer designation. Under the rules for naming objects in binary star systems, the two components are designated A and B. Under the same rules, the first planet discovered orbiting υ Andromedae A should be designated υ Andromedae Ab. Though this more formal form is occasionally used to avoid confusion with a secondary star υ Andromedae B, it is more commonly referred to as υ Andromedae b. The other planets discovered were designated υ Andromedae c, d, and e, in order of their discovery.

In July 2014 the International Astronomical Union (IAU) launched NameExoWorlds, a process for giving proper names to certain exoplanets and their host stars. The process involved public nomination and voting for the new names. In December 2015, the IAU announced the winning names were Titawin for υ Andromedae A and Saffar, Samh and Majriti for three of its planets (b, c and d, respectively).

The winning names were those submitted by the Vega Astronomy Club of Morocco. The star is named after the Berber name Tiṭṭawin, ⵜⵉⵟⵟⴰⵡⵉⵏ, of Morocco's Tétouan city and Tunisia's Tataouine city, both cities' old town quarters are considered UNESCO World Heritage Sites. The planets honour the 10th- and 11th-century astronomers Ibn al-Saffar, Ibn al-Samh and Maslama al-Majriti of Muslim Spain.

In 2016, the IAU organized a Working Group on Star Names (WGSN) to catalog and standardize proper names for stars. In its first bulletin of July 2016, the WGSN explicitly recognized the names of exoplanets and their host stars approved by the Executive Committee Working Group Public Naming of Planets and Planetary Satellites, including the names of stars adopted during the 2015 NameExoWorlds campaign. This star is now so entered in the IAU Catalog of Star Names.

Stellar system
Upsilon Andromedae A has an apparent magnitude of +4.09, making it visible to the naked eye even under moderately light-polluted skies, about 10 degrees east of the Andromeda Galaxy.

The Catalog of Components of Double and Multiple Stars and Washington Double Star Catalog (WDS) both list two companion stars: magnitude 12.6 UCAC3 263-13722 110" away, listed as component B; and magnitude 10.3 F2 star TYC 2822-2067-1 280" away, listed as component C.

A fainter and closer star, discovered in 2002, is confusingly referred to in the discovery paper as υ Andromedae B even though that designation is also used for a different companion. It has been added to the WDS as component D.

Upsilon Andromedae A 
Upsilon Andromedae A is a yellow-white dwarf of spectral type F8V, similar to the Sun, but younger, more massive, and more luminous. According to its entry in the Geneva–Copenhagen survey, the star is around 3.1 billion years old and has a similar proportion of iron relative to hydrogen to the Sun. At around 1.3 solar masses, it will have a shorter lifetime than the Sun. The amount of ultraviolet radiation received by any planets in the star's habitable zone would be similar to the ultraviolet flux the Earth receives from the Sun.

The X-ray emission of Upsilon Andromedae A is low for a star of its spectral class. This means that the star may be moving, or move soon, out of the main sequence and expand its radius to become a red giant star. This is consistent with the upper limits on the age of this star.

Upsilon Andromedae A was ranked 21st in the list of top 100 target stars for NASA's cancelled Terrestrial Planet Finder mission.

Red dwarf
The red dwarf companion has a spectral type M4.5V and is located at a projected separation of 750 AU from the primary star. The true separation between the two stars is unknown because the displacement along the line of sight between Earth and the Upsilon Andromedae stars is unknown, so this value is a minimum separation. Based upon its motion through space, this is a common proper motion companion to the primary. It was discovered in 2002 in data collected as part of the Two-Micron All Sky Survey. The star is less massive and far less luminous than the Sun, and its age seems to be consistent with that of the system.

Planetary system 

The star rotates at an inclination of  degrees relative to Earth.

The innermost planet of the Upsilon Andromedae system was discovered in 1996 and announced in January 1997, together with the planet of Tau Boötis and the innermost planet of 55 Cancri. The discovery was made by Geoffrey Marcy and R. Paul Butler, both astronomers at San Francisco State University. The planet, designated Upsilon Andromedae b, was discovered by measuring changes in the star's radial velocity induced by the planet's gravity. Because of its closeness to the parent star, it induced a large wobble which was detected relatively easily. The planet appears to be responsible for enhanced activity in the chromosphere of its star.

Even when the first planet was taken into account, there still remained significant residuals in the radial velocity measurements, and it was suggested there might be a second planet in orbit. In 1999, astronomers at both San Francisco State University and the Harvard-Smithsonian Center for Astrophysics independently concluded that a three-planet model best fit the data. The two outer planets were designated Upsilon Andromedae c and Upsilon Andromedae d in order of increasing distance from the star. Both of these planets are in more eccentric orbits than any of the planets in the Solar System (including Pluto). Upsilon Andromedae d resides in the system's habitable zone.

The orbital parameters of this three-planet system have been fully determined. The system is not coplanar, with each other or with the stellar rotation, as in our Solar System. Simulations shows that the measured configuration of the planets produces indeed stable orbits for at least 100 million years, where planets b and d remain roughly coplanar. General relativity is expected to have strong effects on planet b, because it orbits at a distance of just ~0.05 AU from the parent star. The apsides of planet c and d, instead, oscillates with time; the orbit of Upsilon Andromedae c thus returns to a nearly circular state every 9,000 years. The eccentricity of those planets may have arisen from a close encounter between the outer planet and a fourth planet, with the result that the third planet was ejected from the system or destroyed. Such a mechanism could have been triggered by perturbations on the orbit of the companion star, which arise from close encounters with other stars and from the tidal field of the Milky Way. The orbits of the two inner planets seems to be shaped by tidal interactions, while the evolution of c and d orbits is secular.

The existence of further planets too small or distant to detect has not been ruled out, though the presence of Jupiter-mass planets as close as 5 AU from Upsilon Andromedae A would make the system unstable. However, a potential fourth planet (Upsilon Andromedae e) was discovered in 2010. This planet seems to be in a 3:1 resonance with Upsilon Andromedae d. Subsequent studies in 2011 and 2014, while finding some evidence for a fourth planet, found large inconsistencies in the estimated orbital period of Upsilon Andromedae e depending on what dataset was used, suggesting that the apparent planetary signal is more likely to be an instrumental artifact.

Upsilon Andromedae does not appear to have a circumstellar dust disk similar to the Kuiper belt in the Solar System. This may be the result of perturbations from the companion star removing material from the outer regions of the Upsilon Andromedae A system.

See also 
 51 Pegasi
 Kepler-56
 Lists of exoplanets
 PSR 1257+12

Notes

References

External links 

 
 
 
 
 
 
 
 HR 0458
 CCDM 01367+4125

 
F-type main-sequence stars
2
Andromedae, 50
Andromedae, Upsilon
007513
0458
009826
M-type main-sequence stars
Durchmusterung objects
Binary stars
0061
J01364784+4124200
Planetary systems with three confirmed planets